Laverton, originally known as British Flag, is a town in the Goldfields region of Western Australia, and the centre of administration for the Shire of Laverton.

About 20% of the population is of Aboriginal descent. It is also quite warm, with mean daily maximum temperatures ranging from 17 °C (62 °F) in July to 36 °C (97 °F) in January.

Laverton is the westernmost town on the Outback Waya proposed highway which goes through the Northern Territory to Winton in outback Queensland.

History
A number of early explorers travelled over the Laverton area, including John Forrest, David Carnegie and Frank Hann. Gold was discovered in the British Flag area in 1896 and many prospectors and miners moved into the area. Among them was Dr Charles W. Laver, who became an enthusiastic supporter and promoter of the region.

One of the most successful mines was Craiggiemore, and by 1897 a residential and business area known as British Flag had sprung up on the west side of the mine. In March 1898 a townsite was approved as Laverton, in honour of Laver. The new site was surveyed in July 1899 and the town of Laverton gazetted in July 1900.

By the late 1960s, Laverton was in decline, mainly because of the very low price of gold. In 1969 Poseidon began drilling Windarra. In September rumours of a nickel strike prompted the Poseidon bubble. The deposit was developed by Western Mining and its partners into the Windarra Nickel Project, which mined and processed nickel ore from 1974 to 1991.

Modern industry

Laverton is primarily a mining area. There are two major operating gold mines in the district: the Wallaby Mine near Granny Smith, owned and operated by Gold Fields, and the Sunrise Dam Gold Mine, owned and operated by AngloGold Ashanti. Both open pit and underground mining is conducted at these mines. The area has a long history of pastoralism with sheep, cattle and goats, and a substantial area of land is used in this way.

Demographics
According to census results from the Australian Bureau of Statistics, the population of the Laverton urban centre fell 23%, from 439 to 340 in the 15 years from 2001 to 2016. Over this same period, the population of Indigenous Australians decreased from 37.6% (165 people) to 20.8% (71 people) of the town.

Climate
Laverton has a semi-arid climate with hot summers and mild to cool winters.

See also
 Laverton Airport

References 

Towns in Western Australia
Mining towns in Western Australia
Shire of Laverton